The 2016 KBS Entertainment Awards took place on December 24, 2016. The main ceremony was hosted by Lee Hwi-jae, Yoo Hee-yeol and Hyeri (Girl's Day), and the red carpet was hosted by Jeon So-mi and Choi Yoo-jung of I.O.I. The ceremony was televised live on KBS.

Winners and nominees

Presenters

Performers

References

External links
 

2016 television awards
2016 in South Korea
KBS Entertainment Awards
Korean Broadcasting System original programming